Awkward may refer to:
 Awkwardness or embarrassment,  an emotional state of intense discomfort with people
 Awkward (TV series), an American teen comedy series
 Awkward (album), a 2001 album by Ty
 Awkward, a 1999 graphic novel by Ariel Schrag
 Awkward (graphic novel), a 2015 graphic novel by Svetlana Chmakova
 "Awkward", a song by Band-Maid from Just Bring It
 "Awkward", a song by The Cells from We Can Replace You
 "Awkward", a 2011 song by San Cisco
 "Awkward", a song by SZA from the 2022 deluxe edition of Ctrl (2017)
 "Awkward", a song by Tyler, the Creator from Wolf

See also